Lopo de Alpoim (c.1400–?) was a Portuguese nobleman, Alcaide of Montemor-o-Velho.

Biography 
Alpoim was born in Coimbra, son of Mendo de Alpoim and Guiomar de Vera, belonging to a noble family of Évora. He was married to Dominga Diaz, daughter of Gil Pires Gusmão, senhor de Pereira.

Lopo de Alpoim died in Covilhã, being buried in the Church of Montemor-o-Velho, having his grave, a shield with Fleur-de-lis. His family descended from noble families of French, Portuguese and Galician origin.

References

External links 
geneall.net
Nobiliário de familias de Portugal (ALPUINS)

1400 births
1400s deaths
Portuguese nobility
15th-century Portuguese people
People from Coimbra
People from Montemor-o-Velho